Folsom points are projectile points associated with the Folsom tradition of North America. The style of tool-making was named after the Folsom site located in Folsom, New Mexico, where the first sample was found in 1908 by George McJunkin within the bone structure of a bison, an animal hunted by the Folsom people in New Mexico. The Folsom point was identified as a unique style of projectile point in 1926.

Description 
The points are bifacially worked and have a symmetrical, leaf-like shape with a concave base and wide, shallow grooves running almost the entire length of the point. The edges are finely worked. The characteristic groove, known as fluting, may have served to aid hafting to a wooden shaft or dart. Use-wear studies have shown that some examples were used as knives as well as projectile points.  The fluting required great technical ability to effect, and it took archaeologists many years of experimentation to replicate it. This point is thought to be the pinnacle of the fluting technology. The flute was made by creating a nipple platform at the center of the base.  The remnants of the nipple may be present on completed examples.

Age and cultural affiliations 

Folsom points are found widely across North America and are dated to the period between 9500 BCE and 8000 BCE. The discovery of these artifacts in the early 20th century raised questions about when the first humans arrived in North America. The prevailing idea of a time depth of about 3,000 years was clearly mistaken.

In 1932, an even earlier style of projectile point was found, Clovis, dating back to 11,500 BCE. Clovis points have been found in situ in association with mammoth skeletons.

In the Great Plains area, the use of Folsom points was supplanted over time by Plano points of the various Plano cultures.

See also 
Folsom tradition
Cascade point
Clovis point
Plano point
Eden point
Cumberland point
Levanna projectile point
Jack's Reef pentagonal projectile point
Lamoka projectile point
Susquehanna broad projectile point
Bare Island projectile point
Greene projectile point

External links 
American Museum of Natural History--Folsom Point

References 
 republished in  
 

Paleo-Indian period
Projectile points
Indigenous weapons of the Americas